McLean County Courthouse may refer to:

McLean County Courthouse and Square, Bloomington, Illinois
Former McLean County Courthouse, Washburn, North Dakota
McLean County Courthouse (North Dakota), Washburn, North Dakota